Emmalocera subconcinnella is a species of snout moth in the genus Emmalocera. It was described by Émile Louis Ragonot in 1890. It is found in Burma.

References

Moths described in 1890
Subconcinella
Moths of Asia